The  New York Giants season was the franchise's 27th season in the National Football League. They finished at 9–2–1, with both losses against the Cleveland Browns.

It was the Yanks' final game ever.

Regular season

Schedule

Standings

See also
List of New York Giants seasons

References

New York Giants seasons
New York Giants
New York Giants season
1950s in Manhattan
Washington Heights, Manhattan